This is a list of rivers in Jordan. This list is arranged by drainage basin, with respective tributaries indented under each larger stream's name.  Many of these rivers are seasonal.

Dead Sea

Jordan River
The Jordan River is the major river flowing into the Dead Sea from the north.  It also is the northern part of the western border of Jordan. From north to south the rivers flowing into it are:
Yarmouk River - largest tributary of the Jordan and forms part of the northern border of Jordan with Syria and Israel. Flows into the Jordan just south of the Sea of Galilee
Wadi al-'Arab
Wadi Ziqlab
Wadi al-Yabis
Wadi Kafranja or Kufrinjah, passing near Ajloun
Zarqa River (Jabbok River) - second largest tributary of the Jordan, flows in about half way between the Sea of Galilee and the Dead Sea
Wadi Zulayl (Wadi Dhuleil)
Wadi Shu'ayb (Wadi Sha'eb)
Wadi al Gharabah
Wadi ar-Ramah
Wadi al Kafrayn
Wadi as Seer

Other rivers
Other rivers that flow directly into the Dead Sea are:
Wadi Zarqa' Ma'in
Wadi Mujib (Arnon)
Wadi al-Haydan
Wadi an-Nukhaylah
Wadi al-Hafirah
Wadi ash-Shuqayq
Wadi al-Karak
Wadi Arabah (Wadi al-Jayb) - the valley to the south of the Dead Sea and also the southern border with Israel
Wadi Zered also known as Wadi al Hasa.  
Wadi al-Fidan
Wadi al-Buwayridah
Wadi Musa

Red Sea (Gulf of Aqaba)

Wadi Yitm
Wadi Rum

Syrian Desert

Wadi Sirhan
Far Wadi al Abyad
Wadi Fakk Abu Thiran
Wadi al Fukuk
Wadi el Hasah
Wadi al Gharra
Wadi Ba'ir
Wadi al Makhruq
Wadi al Jashshah al Adlah
Wadi Rijlat
Wadi al Ghadaf
Wadi al Janab

Qa Al Jafr
Wadi Abu Safah
Wadi al Buraykah
Wadi Abu Tarafah
Wadi Abu 'Amud
Wadi al Jahdaniyah
Wadi Kabid
Wadi al 'Unab

References

Rand McNally, The New International Atlas, 1993.
 GEOnet Names Server

Jordan
Rivers